Silver City is a 1984 Australian film about post-war Polish immigration to Australia, following World War II.  "Silver City" is the nickname of the immigration hostel in Australia. David Stratton calls it one of the best Australian films of the 1980s and thought that it should have made Gosia Dobrowolska a major star.

Cast
 Gosia Dobrowolska as "Nina"
 Ivar Kants as "Julian"
 Anna Jemison as "Anna"
 Steve Bisley as "Victor"
 Debra Lawrance as "Helena"
 Ewa Bok as "Mrs. Bronowska"
 Dennis Miller as "Max"
 Alan Cinis as "Charlie"

Production
Sophia Turkiewicz had long been interested in making a film about post war migrants to Australia. She attended the Australian Film and Television School in Sydney where she made a short drama Letters from Poland about a Polish refugee. She started writing the film in 1978 while studying in Poland, originally concentrating on a ship full of Polish refugees going to Australia, then focusing on what happened when they arrived.<ref name="papers">Christine Cremen, "Sophia Turkiewicz", Cinema Papers, August 1984 p237-239, 287</ref> She sent an outline to Joan Long who agreed to produce. After Turkiewicz did five drafts, Long then suggested a co-writer be brought on board and Thomas Keneally - who had visited Poland as part of his research for Schindler's Ark - became involved."Interview with SOPHIA TURKEWICZ", Signis, 19 November 1998. Retrieved 21 November 2012

During the early 1980s Long and Turkiewicz became frustrated at the progress of getting up the film and for a time developed another project, Time's Raging based on stories by Frank Moorhouse but eventually went back to Silver City. The Money was eventually raised through 10BA tax concessions.

Gosia Dobrowolska, who had newly arrived in Australia, auditioned for the lead and impressed despite not knowing any English. However she struggled at a reading of the script and the role was given to Megan Williams instead. Then there was a delay in financing which put the film back a year. Dobrowolska improved her English and impressed the director and producer in a play she was appearing in; Williams was let go and Dobrowolska was cast. (Williams later sued and the matter settled out of court.)

Andrzej Seweryn and Sam Neill were candidates to play the male lead before Ivar Kants was cast. Shooting began in October 1983 and went for seven weeks.

Awards
 Sydney Critic's Circle award for Best Feature Film of the year .
 AFI award – Steve Bisley for Best Supporting Actor
 AFI award – Anna Maria Monticelli for Best Actress in a Supporting Role.
 AFI award – for Costume Design

Box officeSilver City grossed $197,839 at the box office in Australia, which is equivalent to $502,003 in 2009 dollars.

Novelization
Concurrent with the release of the film, Penguin Books Australia issued a paperback novelization of the screenplay by American-Australian novelist Sara Dowse. The book was distributed in Australia, New Zealand, the UK and North America.

References

Further reading
 "The Dictionary of Performing Arts in Australia – Theatre . Film . Radio . Television – Volume 1" – Ann Atkinson, Linsay Knight, Margaret McPhee – Allen & Unwin Pty. Ltd., 1996
 "The Australian Film and Television Companion''" – compiled by Tony Harrison – Simon & Schuster Australia, 1994

External links
 
 New York Times review of Silver City
Silver City at Oz Movies

1984 films
Australian drama films
1984 drama films
1980s English-language films